The Western Downs colonial by-election, 1864 was a by-election held on 2 November 1864 in the electoral district of Western Downs for the Queensland Legislative Assembly.

History
On 2 October 1864, Thomas DeLacy Moffat, one of the members of Western Downs, happened to die. FOr this reason, John Watts won the resulting by-election on 2 November 1864.

See also
 Members of the Queensland Legislative Assembly, 1863–1867

References

1864 elections in Australia
Queensland state by-elections
1860s in Queensland